Reutje or 't Reutje is a hamet in Dutch Limburg.  It belongs to the municipality of Roerdalen. It lies a few km from Sint Odiliënberg.

It was first mentioned in 1251 as "curtis in Raetken", and means "cultivated forest". Reutje has place name signs. It was home to 184 people in 1840.

There is a small café 'Bie Tiel' and a big fanfare, Sint Wiro. Reutje also has its own song: Träötje mien Landj, composed by Wiel Janssen and Pièrre Bonné.

References

External links 
 roerdalen.nl

Populated places in Limburg (Netherlands)
Roerdalen